Stephen Massicotte (born April 18, 1969 in Trenton, Ontario) is a Canadian playwright, screenwriter and actor from Calgary, Alberta.

Personal life
Massicotte is an atheist.

Plays

The Jedi Handbooks trilogy
The Boy's Own Jedi Handbook
The Girls Strike Back
The Return of the Jedi Handbook
Mary's Wedding
The Oxford Roof Climber's Rebellion
The Emperor of Atlantis
The Last Seduction of Casanova
Looking After Eden
Pervert
A Farewell to Kings
The Clockmaker

Screenplays
The Dark
Ginger Snaps Back: The Beginning

Opera
Mary's Wedding (libretto)

See also
List of Canadian playwrights

References

External links

21st-century Canadian dramatists and playwrights
Canadian male screenwriters
University of Calgary alumni
Male actors from Calgary
Writers from Calgary
1969 births
Living people
People from Quinte West
Writers from Ontario
Male actors from Ontario
Canadian male television actors
Canadian male dramatists and playwrights
21st-century Canadian male writers
Canadian atheists
21st-century Canadian screenwriters